Bhawanipur Anchalik College is an undergraduate college established in the year 1982 at Bhawanipur of Barpeta district in Assam. The college is affiliated to Gauhati University.

Accreditation
In 2015 the college was awarded "B" grade by National Assessment and Accreditation Council (NAAC). The college is also recognised by University Grants Commission (India).

References

External links

Colleges affiliated to Gauhati University
Universities and colleges in Assam
Barpeta district
Educational institutions established in 1982
1982 establishments in Assam